Reconciliation (originally named Reunion) is  a sculpture by Josefina de Vasconcellos.

Originally created in 1977 and entitled Reunion, it depicted a man and woman embracing each other ]. In May 1998 it was presented  to University of Bradford as a memorial to the University's first Vice-Chancellor Professor Ted Edwards. De Vasconcellos said:
"The sculpture was originally conceived in the aftermath of the War. Europe was in shock, people were stunned. I read in a newspaper about a woman who crossed Europe on foot to find her husband, and I was so moved that I made the sculpture. Then I thought that it wasn't only about the reunion of two people but hopefully a reunion of nations which had been fighting."

Later it was taken for repairs to the sculptor's workshop, and renamed Reconciliation upon the request of the  Peace Studies Department of the University.  It was unveiled for the second time, under the new name, on de Vasconcellos 90th birthday, October 26, 1994.

In 1995 (to mark the 50th anniversary of the end of World War II) bronze casts of this sculpture  (as Reconciliation) were placed in the ruins of Coventry Cathedral and in the Hiroshima Peace Park in Japan. An additional cast can be found in the Stormont Estate in Belfast. To mark the opening of the rebuilt German Reichstag (parliament building) in 1999, another cast was placed as part of the Berlin Wall memorial.

References

Monuments and memorials in West Yorkshire
Monuments and memorials in Japan
Monuments and memorials in Germany
Monuments and memorials in Northern Ireland
Monuments and memorials in the West Midlands (county)
Peace monuments and memorials
Sculptures of men
Sculptures of women
Statues
Coventry Cathedral